"Give Me Some Emotion" is a song written and originally recorded by Webster Lewis in 1979. It is a track from his Eight for the Eighties LP, and was released as a single in early 1980.  His version reached #107 on the U.S. Billboard pop chart and #41 on the U.S. R&B chart.

The song was covered that same year by Merry Clayton with the shortened title, "Emotion." It is the title track of her fourth LP.  Her rendition peaked at #53 on the U.S. R&B chart.

References

External links
 Lyrics of this song
  (Webster Lewis)
  (Merry Clayton)

1980 singles
1979 songs